The Arellano Félix is a surname that may pertain to several individuals involved with the Tijuana Cartel (also known as the Arellano Félix Organization).

 Benjamín Arellano Félix (born 1952), Mexican drug lord, now imprisoned
 Carlos Arellano Félix (born 1955), Surgeon by training, Mexican drug lord
 Eduardo Arellano Félix (born 1956), Mexican drug lord, now imprisoned
 Enedina Arellano Félix (born 1961), Mexican drug lord, fugitive
 Francisco Javier Arellano Félix (born 1969), Mexican drug lord, now imprisoned
 Francisco Rafael Arellano Félix (1949–2013), Mexican drug lord
 Ramón Arellano Félix (1964–2002), Mexican drug lord

Compound surnames